Alberto Soria Ortega (24 January 1906 - 23 June 1980) was a Peruvian football defender who played for Peru in the 1930 FIFA World Cup.

Club career
Nicknamed el Doctor, he was the first major player who left Alianza Lima for eternal rivals Universitario de Deportes in 1933.

International career
Soria earned 6 caps for Peru between 1930 and 1937.

References

External links
 
FIFA profile

1906 births
1980 deaths
Association football defenders
Peruvian footballers
Peru international footballers
Club Alianza Lima footballers
Club Universitario de Deportes footballers
1930 FIFA World Cup players